Sarcopodium is a genus of anamorphic fungi in the division Ascomycota. It was described by German naturalist Christian Gottfried Ehrenberg in 1818.

Species in the genus include:
Sarcopodium ammonis
Sarcopodium araliae
Sarcopodium atrum
Sarcopodium avenaceum
Sarcopodium circinatum
Sarcopodium circinosetiferum
Sarcopodium coffeanum
Sarcopodium flavum
Sarcopodium foliicola
Sarcopodium fulvescens
Sarcopodium fuscum
Sarcopodium macalpinei
Sarcopodium nigrum
Sarcopodium oculorum
Sarcopodium pironii
Sarcopodium rosellum
Sarcopodium roseum
Sarcopodium saccardianum
Sarcopodium saccardoanum
Sarcopodium salicellum
Sarcopodium synnemaferum
Sarcopodium synnematoferum
Sarcopodium tortuosum
Sarcopodium vanillae
Sarcopodium variegatum

See also
List of mitosporic Ascomycota

References

Ascomycota enigmatic taxa
Ascomycota genera
Taxa named by Christian Gottfried Ehrenberg
Taxa described in 1818